is a Japanese video game music composer. She previously worked for Capcom in the 1980s, writing music for games such as Dynasty Wars, Mercs, Magic Sword, and the original Mega Man.

Career 
She previously worked for Capcom, where she worked on titles such as SonSon II, Dynasty Wars, U.N. Squadron, Mercs, Magic Sword, and Carrier Air Wing. She is best known, however, for composing the music for the original Mega Man, including its iconic "Game Start" jingle. Matsumae was known during her days at Capcom by her maiden name, but was usually credited by her alias, Chanchacorin.

Following her departure from Capcom in 1991, she became a freelance composer. The soundtracks she worked on afterwards include the Derby Stallion series, Game Boy titles developed by Sunsoft, and other games such as The Adventures of Lolo, Another Bible, Daffy Duck: The Marvin Missions, Jade Cocoon 2, and Dragon Quest Swords: The Masked Queen and the Tower of Mirrors. She also married fellow musician, Kimitaka Matsumae (originally part of Sega's S.S.T. Band), with whom she worked with on Othello World and Jade Cocoon 2.

Matsumae returned to the Mega Man series via Inti Creates, serving as a guest arranger for some of its album releases, and joining several other former Mega Man composers in creating the Robot Master themes for Mega Man 10. In 2014, she joined the Tokyo based label Brave Wave. The label aims to help connect composers with international companies, which is how she contributed music to Shovel Knight.

In July 2015, it was announced that Matsumae would be working on her first original solo album, in addition to a tribute album featuring arrangements by her. The album, titled Three Movements, was released in December 2017.

Works

References

External links
 Brave Wave profile

1964 births
Alph Lyla members
Capcom people
Japanese music arrangers
Japanese women composers
Japanese women musicians
Living people
Musicians from Tokyo
Video game composers